Pori Bears is a Finnish american football club based in Pori, Finland. The team was established in 1982 and it plays in the second tier league of american football in Finland.

History 
Bears have competed in the top-tier league of Finland, Vaahteraliiga, three times (1982, 1987–88, 2003–2004)

Mike Leach (American football coach) served as the Bears head coach in the 1989 season in the Finnish 1st Division (American football) of Finland. Leach went on to become a very successful head football coach at the college level in the USA.

Honours

1st Division (2nd highest level in Finland)
 Spagettimalja bowl champion (2): 1986, 2002

References 

American football in Finland